Valentin Borisovich Bubukin (23 April 1933 – 30 October 2008) was a Soviet/Russian footballer.

Biography
Bubukin started training in aged 12 in the club Krylia Sovetov. He then moved to VVS Moscow, but the team was disbanded in 1952, and Bubukin went to FC Lokomotiv Moscow, where he spent most of his career. He made his debut for USSR on September 6, 1959 in a friendly against Czechoslovakia (he was selected for the 1958 FIFA World Cup squad, but did not play in any games at the tournament). He played in the first ever European Nations' Cup in 1960, which was won by the Soviet team.

After retiring in 1965, he worked as a football manager of Lokomotiv Moscow (1966–1968), SC Tavriya Simferopol (1970–1972), FC Karpaty Lviv (1972–1974), PFC CSKA Moscow (1975–1978, 1981–1987) and CSKA Hanoi (1978), winning the national title with CSKA Hanoi in Vietnam in 1978.

Honours

 1960 European Nations' Cup winner.
 Soviet Top League runner-up: 1959.
 Soviet Cup winner: 1957.
 V-League winner (as a coach): 1978.

Awards
Order of Friendship (1997)
Order of Honour (2003)
Medal "For Labour Valour" (1960)
Medal of Friendship (Vietnam)

References

External links

Profile 

1933 births
2008 deaths
1958 FIFA World Cup players
Soviet Top League players
FC Lokomotiv Moscow players
PFC CSKA Moscow players
Russian football managers
Russian footballers
Soviet football managers
Soviet footballers
Soviet Union international footballers
1960 European Nations' Cup players
UEFA European Championship-winning players
SC Tavriya Simferopol managers
FC Lokomotiv Moscow managers
FC Karpaty Lviv managers
Footballers from Moscow

Association football forwards